Lin Xin (廩辛) was king of the Shang dynasty of China. His name by Bamboo Annals is Feng Xin (冯辛), another book The Historic People of Han Book (汉书, 古今人表) also called him Feng Xin.

He got his throne in the year of Gengyan (庚寅). His capital was at Yin (殷).

According to Bamboo Annals, he ruled 4 years, but the Records of the Grand Historian says 6 years.

Shang dynasty kings
12th-century BC Chinese monarchs